Paralaubuca stigmabrachium is a species of freshwater ray-finned fish from the family Cyprinidae, the carps and minnows from south east Asia. It occurs in the Mekong and Chao Praya basins.

References

Fish of Thailand
Cyprinid fish of Asia
Paralaubuca
Fish described in 1934